Ibrium (2322-2302 BC), also spelt Ebrium, was the vizier of Ebla for king Irkab-Damu and his successor Isar-Damu.

Ibrium is attested to have campaigned against the city of Abarsal during the time of vizier Arrukum. He took office after Arrukum during the last two years of Irkab-Damu's reign and continued to hold office during the reign of Isar-Damu. Ibrium kept his position for about 20 years and was succeeded by his son Ibbi-Sipish, thus establishing a parallel dynasty of viziers next to the royal family.

Ibrium waged a war against Armi in his ninth year as vizier. The Ebla tablets mention that the battle happened near a town called Batin (a location possibly located in modern northeastern Aleppo), and that a messenger arrived in Ebla with news about the defeating of Armi. He also conducted several campaigns against rebellious vassals and concluded a peace and trading treaty with Abarsal.

References

24th-century BC people
Ebla